The Béez, is a left tributary of the Gave de Pau, in Béarn (Pyrénées-Atlantiques), in the Southwest of France. It flows into the Gave de Pau upstream from Pau, between the Ouzoum and the Luz.

Name 
The name Béez, which presents some parallelism with those of the Léez or the Néez, is in fact a variant of the name of the Baïse.

The names of the Bès, a tributary of the neighboring Luz, and of the Bez, a tributary of the Midouze, are related.

Geography 
The Béez rises on the slopes of the Pic Durban, elevation , where it is known as the Bazest, Baseigt or Baset. It flows north into the Gave de Pau in Nay.

Départements and towns 
 Pyrénées-Atlantiques: Pé-de-Hourat, Capbis, Nay.

Main tributaries 
Baseigt / Baset
 (R) the Izou, from the Izou Pass (847 m),
 (L) the Cau de Heus
Béez
 (L) the Lestarrès / Lestarrezoû, from Louvie-Juzon.
 (R) the Escourreix
 (R) the Soulens, from the Sarramayou (491 m).
 (L) the Landistou, from Sainte-Colome, Lys and Bruges.

References

Rivers of France
Rivers of Pyrénées-Atlantiques
Rivers of Nouvelle-Aquitaine